Dilworthtown is an unincorporated community and census-designated place (CDP) in Chester and Delaware counties, Pennsylvania, United States. It was first listed as a CDP prior to the 2020 census.

The CDP is primarily in southeastern Chester County but extends south into western Delaware County. The Chester County part of the community is in Birmingham Township, while the Delaware County part is in Chadds Ford Township. U.S. Route 202 forms the eastern border of the CDP; the highway leads north  to West Chester and south  to Wilmington, Delaware.

The Dilworthtown Historic District, listed on the National Register of Historic Places, occupies the crossroads of Brintons Bridge Road, Oakland Road, Birmingham Road, and Old Wilmington Pike at the historic center of town.

Demographics

References 

Census-designated places in Chester County, Pennsylvania
Census-designated places in Delaware County, Pennsylvania
Census-designated places in Pennsylvania